A partial lunar eclipse occurred on 22 May 1453.

Observations
It was seen during the Fall of Constantinople (the capture of the capital of the Byzantine Empire), during the siege that lasted from Thursday, 5 April 1453 until Tuesday, 29 May 1453), after which the city fell to the Ottomans. The lunar eclipse was considered to be fulfilling a prophecy for the city's demise, which says a blood moon took place during the eclipse.

Visibility

The partial eclipse was visible from, Africa, Asia, Europe and Oceania.

References
 NASA: Lunar Eclipses of Historical Interest
 NASA graphics

External links
 www.economist.com The fall of Constantinople, Dec 23rd 1999
 www.wordinfo.info: A Lunar Eclipse that Contributed to the Fall of Constantinople

1453-05
1453
15th century in science